Amara chaudoiri is a species of beetle of the genus Amara in the family Carabidae.

Subspecies
There are three subspecies of A. chaudoiri:

 Amara chaudoiri chaudoiri Schaum, 1858
 Amara chaudoiri incognita Fassati, 1946
 Amara chaudoiri transcaucasiens Hieke, 1970

References

chaudoiri
Beetles described in 1858
Taxa named by Hermann Rudolph Schaum